The Ontario Undergraduate Student Alliance (OUSA) is an alliance of students' unions in Ontario, Canada. Their common objective is to protect the interests of over 150,000 professional and undergraduate, full-time and part-time university students, and to provide research and recommendations to the government on how to improve accessibility, affordability, accountability, and quality of post-secondary education in Ontario.

History
The initial catalyst for the creation of OUSA was disagreement over the position of the provincial and national student association in Ontario on the first Gulf War. In 1992, The student associations of Brock University, Queen's University, the University of Waterloo and Wilfrid Laurier University, and the Association of Part-Time Undergraduate Students at the University of Toronto approached the Ontario Federation of Students(OFS) to host a roundtable discussing the prospect of pushing for an increase in tuition fees. When this idea was rejected, the roundtable occurred informally and resulted in the formal incorporation and creation of OUSA.

Part-time students at the University of Toronto withdrew from the Alliance, as did Queen's Alma Mater Society, citing concerns over the organization's management in the mid-1990s. Queen's then rejoined the Alliance as an associate member in 2001 and then as a full member in 2004. In May 2011, OUSA welcomed two new members, the Trent in Oshawa Student Association (later the Trent Durham Student Association) as associate members, and the McMaster Association of Part-Time Students as full members, who had rejoined after a 7-year absence.  In May 2013, the University of Windsor Students' Alliance voted, through a referendum, to leave the Alliance. On April 29, 2014, the McMaster Association of Part-Time Students also withdrew from membership in OUSA.

The Students' General Association (SGA-AGÉ) of Laurentian University was admitted into OUSA in April 2016, with membership taking effect May 2016.

Members
As of 2020, OUSA's membership consists of:
Trent Durham Student Association
Laurentian University Students' General Association/Association Générale des Étudiants
Wilfrid Laurier University Students' Union
McMaster Students Union
Waterloo Undergraduate Student Association
Brock University Students' Union
University Students' Council of Western University
Alma Mater Society of Queen's University

Steering Committee
OUSA's Steering Committee is an eight-member board of directors responsible for the overall strategy of the organization. One executive member of each constituent student union sits on the board as a voting member. According to the organization's Bylaws, each association is entitled to appoint one additional non-voting resource member to OUSA's Steering Committee.  Alma Mater Society of Queen's University is the only OUSA member in recent years that regularly uses this provision to appoint an additional member. 

As of December 2022, the membership of the committee is:

Criticisms
Due to its moderate leanings when compared with other student advocacy groups and close working relationship with many decision makers, OUSA has faced criticism that they are too cooperative with the government. OUSA has also received criticism for a mid 1990s proposal that asked for increased government spending towards universities along with increased tuition fees, however this recommendation was reversed a few years later, and OUSA has called for tuition freezes and decreases since at least 1999.

Presidents and Executive Directors
Presidents

 1998 - 1999	Kenzie Campbell
 1999 - 2000	Basil Alexander
 2000 - 2001	Mark Schaan
 2001 - 2002	Erin McCloskey
 2002 - 2003	Josh Morgan
 2003 - 2004	Jeff LaPorte
 2004 - 2005	Alison Forbes
 2005 - 2006	Stephanie Murray
 2006 - 2007	Paris Meilleur
 2007 - 2008	David Simmonds
 2008 - 2009	Trevor Mayoh
 2009 - 2010	Dan Moulton
 2010 - 2011	Meaghan Coker
 2011 - 2012	Sean Madden
 2012 - 2013     Alysha Li
 2013 - 2014     Amir Eftekarpour
 2014 - 2015     Jen Carter
 2015 - 2016     Spencer Nestico-Semianiw
 2016 - 2017     Jamie Cleary
 2017 - 2018     Andrew Clubine
 2018 - 2019     Danny Chang
 2019 - 2020     Catherine Dunne
 2020 - 2021     Julia Pereira
 2021 - 2022     Eunice Oladejo
 2022 - Present  Jessica Look

Executive Directors

 1994 - 1996	Michael Burns 	
 1997	Rick Marin (Interim)
 1997 - 1998	Barry McCartan	
 1998 - 1999	Andrew Boggs 	
 1999 - 2001	Ryan Parks 	
 2001 - 2002	Bryce Rudyk     	
 2002	James Meloche (Interim)	
 2002 - 2003	Leslie Church 	
 2003 - 2005	Adam Spence
 2005 - 2007	Scott Courtice
 2007 - 2008	Chris Locke 	
 2008 - 2009	Howie Bender	
 2009 - 2011	Alexi White
 2011 – 2012	Sam Andrey
 2012 - 2013 Rylan Kinnon
 2014 – 2015 Sean Madden
 2015 – 2017 Zachary Rose
 2017 – 2018 Sophie Helpard
 2019 – 2022 Eddy Avila
 2023- Present Malika Dhanani

References 
Information taken from OUSA's website unless otherwise stated. Presidents and Executive Directors updated annually.

External links

'Students Concerned About Rising Tuition' Globe & Mail article
'Food For Thought Campaign' Toronto Star article
'Loans shunned out of ignorance' National Post article
"OUSA/CFS article in The Varsity

See also
College Student Alliance
Undergraduates of Canadian Research Intensive Universities

 
Groups of students' unions